He Dan (born 22 July 1984) is a Chinese race walker.

Achievements

References

1984 births
Living people
Chinese female racewalkers
Asian Games medalists in athletics (track and field)
Athletes (track and field) at the 2006 Asian Games
Asian Games bronze medalists for China
Medalists at the 2006 Asian Games